A chaika (/ ,  or ) was a wooden boat that could have a mast and sail, a type of galley, used in early modern warfare and cargo transport by the:
Zaporozhian Cossacks in the 16th–17th centuries in Ukraine on the Dnipro River and the Black Sea.
Serbs in the 16th-19th centuries on the Danube, known as Šajkaši, under the Kingdom of Hungary, Austrian Empire and Habsburgs.
Slovenes from the 16th to the early 20th century on the Drava River.

Types

Austrian
Tschaika were either 24 (Ganz ("Full") Tschaika) or 12 metres (Halb ("Half") Tschaika) in length, operated by sail or oars. Between 30 and 50 men were in service, commanded by an officer, with an NCO helmsman, an armourer, a drummer, two bowsmen, and up to 36 oarsmen.

Zaporizhian Host (Ukraine)

Chaikas were between 18 and 20 metres in length, 3 and 3.5 metres in width, and 3.5 and 4 metres in depth. The bottom of a chaika was carved out of a single tree trunk, with sides built out of wooden planks. To protect the boat from enemy guns or from sinking, reed bales were tied to the gunwales of the boat. Some chaikas also had two steering oar's, so that the boat never needed turning around in order to switch direction. One such boat could carry around 50 to 60 men and up to 6 falconets (small cannon).

A similar, but larger boat used by the Zaporozhian Cossacks for both transport and warfare was called a baidak.

References

External links
The Viking "drakkar" and the Kozak "chaika"

Boat types
Ships of Serbia
Naval ships of Ukraine
Military history of Serbia
Military history of Ukraine
Early Modern history of Serbia
Zaporozhian Host
Transport in Styria (Slovenia)
History of transport in Slovenia
Drava
Cossack culture